Balearic Beauty is the fourth full-length album from German electronic composer and producer Roger-Pierre Shah, released under his Sunlounger alias. It was released through Magic Island Records on August 19, 2013.

Track listing

Personnel
 Jörg Stenzel - Guitar on 'Relaxation'
 Rocking J - Production on 'Find My Way'
 Inger Hansen - Vocals on 'Come As You Are'
 Kingseyes - vocals on 'I Just Wanna Dance With You'
 Alexandra Badoi - vocals on 'I'll Be Fine'
 Suzie Del Vecchio - vocals on 'If You Were Here'
 Yoav - vocals on 'Today Tonight'
 Andre Frauenstein - vocals on 'Mojito'
 JES - vocals on 'Glitter and Gold'
 Chase - vocals on 'Surrender'
 Sason Bishope Parry - vocals on 'Find My Way'

External links
 Black Hole Recordings Announcement of Album
 Announcement on joonbug.com
 Rogershah.net
 Facebook page
Myspace page

2013 albums
Roger Shah albums